A number of ships have been named Seahorse or Sea Horse after the marine creature, including:-

Merchant ships
 The transport ship Sea Horse was wrecked in Tramore Bay on 30 January 1816 with the loss of 376 of the 402 people on board. She was on a voyage from Ramsgate to Cork.
  - a Tanzanian tanker in service 2012-16
  - a ship captured by pirates in 2009

Naval ships

Royal Navy
  was a ship captured in 1626 and last mentioned in 1635.
  was a hoy captured in 1654 and sold in 1655.
  was a 10-gun fireship purchased from the Dutch in 1694, later used as a water boat, and sunk as a foundation in 1698.
  was a 24-gun sixth rate launched in 1694 and wrecked in 1704.
  was a 14-gun sixth rate launched in 1709 and wrecked in 1711.
  was a 20-gun sixth rate launched in 1712, rebuilt in 1727 and sold in 1748.
  was a 24-gun sixth rate launched in 1748 and sold in 1784.
  was a 38-gun fifth rate launched in 1794 and broken up in 1819.
  was a 46-gun fifth rate launched in 1830. She was converted to a screw frigate in 1847, then a screw mortar vessel in 1856. She was renamed Lavinia and used as a coal hulk in 1870 and was sold in 1902.
  was a 670-ton twin screw survey ship, launched in 1881 and sold for scrap in 1920.
  was an S-class submarine launched in 1932 and sunk in 1940.

United States Navy
  was a one-gun schooner, purchased by the Navy in 1812 for service in the War of 1812. She was beached and burned to prevent capture in 1814.

References

Ship names